Give Me a Call is a song written by Pauline Kamusewu, Johan Wetterberg och Michel Zitron, and recorded by Pauline Kamusewu on her 2009 album I Never Said I Was An Angel.

The song charted at Svensktoppen for two weeks. before leaving chart.

Charts

Weekly charts

Year-end charts

References 

2009 singles
English-language Swedish songs
2009 songs
Songs written by Michel Zitron
Pauline Kamusewu songs